The 1932 Minnesota gubernatorial election took place on November 8, 1932. Farmer–Labor Party candidate Floyd B. Olson defeated Republican Party of Minnesota challenger Earle Brown. Franklin Ellsworth unsuccessfully ran for the Republican nomination.

Results

See also
 List of Minnesota gubernatorial elections

External links
 http://www.sos.state.mn.us/home/index.asp?page=653
 http://www.sos.state.mn.us/home/index.asp?page=657

Minnesota
Gubernatorial
1932
November 1932 events in the United States